Gyula Kádár (16 December 1898 - 14 March 1982) was a Hungarian military officer who was the head of the Hungarian military intelligence from August 1943 until the occupation of Hungary by Nazi German forces during World War II.

Biography
From 1912 to 1916 he studied at the Royal Hungarian Military High School, in Sopron. After graduation, he continued his studies at the Royal Hungarian Ludovica Defense Academy. On 17 August 1918, he graduated as a lieutenant.

During the revolutions of 1918/19 he served with the 5th Infantry Regiment, in Szeged. In November 1919, he joined as an officer to the National Army, which was a counter-revolutionary force under the command of Miklós Horthy. Soon he became a company commander in a newly formed infantry regiment in Szeged. In 1922 he was promoted to First Lieutenant and transferred to Debrecen.

In 1933 he became a teacher on the Ludovika Academy, where he taught infantry tactics for artillery officers. In 1937, he was promoted to Major and took over the teaching of military tactics. 1939 he was transferred to Pécs, as the head of the training department of the IV Corps. After the mobilization he became the Deputy Chief of Staff for Logistics of the corps. In September 1940, he took part with the IV Corps in the entry to Northern Transylvania, and in the spring of 1941 in the invasion of Yugoslavia.

In January 1942, he was promoted to colonel and in May 1942 he was transferred to the General Staff, as the head of the Vezérkari Főnökség 6  or VKF-6, the Sixth Department of the General Staff (which department was dedicated to dealing with national security and propaganda affairs).

On August 1, 1943, he became the leader of the VKF-2, the Second Department of the General Staff (intelligence and counter-intelligence).

On the orders of General Ferenc Szombathelyi he prepared plans to the Hungarian Army to help and support the landing of British paratroopers and airborne troops in Hungary, which scenario was proposed by the British on the secret negotiations with the Kállay government. Kádár warned his superiors of the threat of a German invasion in early 1944. In February 1944 he contacted Endre Bajcsy-Zsilinszky, a well-known anti-Nazi politician and resistance leader in order to help Regent Horthy's plans to withdraw Hungary from the war by forming a broad coalition of anti-Nazi political forces.

On 17 April 1944 he was arrested by the Gestapo. After the intervention of Defence Minister Lajos Csatay and Miklós Horthy, Jr. he was handed over to the Hungarian authorities. The Hungarian Military Tribunal released him on 1 June 1944. Because of the German protest Chief of the General Staff János Vörös ordered his arrest again on 2 October 1944. After that, he was charged with high treason at the Special Court of the Chief of the General Staff, but he was acquitted from all charges on 14 October 1944. A day later, after the coup of the Arrow Cross Party he was again arrested by the order of the new, pro-Nazi Defence Minister Károly Beregfy. As the Soviet Army approached Budapest he was transferred to Sopronkőhida and later in March, 1945 to Germany. He was released from captivity by the US Army near Triften, Bavaria.

He was arrested on 20 September 1945, when he entered Hungary at Hegyeshalom by the Military Political Department (the new military intelligence agency under communist leadership). He was handed over to the Soviets, and a Soviet military tribunal sentenced him to 15 years forced labor in the Soviet Union, as a war criminal. He returned home 10 years later, in 1955. When he entered the country he was arrested and investigated again, until he was released from captivity on 25 September 1956.

His memoirs, From the Ludovika to Sopronkőhida were first published, heavily censored, in 1978.

References

- Article of the Hungarian Reference Encyclopedia on Gyula Kádár (in Hungarian) OSZK National Library - Kádár Gyula.

1898 births
1982 deaths
Hungarian military personnel of World War II
People from Debrecen